Rock Island Township is a township in Williams County, North Dakota, United States. As of the 2010 census it had a population of zero.

References

Populated places in Williams County, North Dakota
Townships in North Dakota